Brett Holcombe is an Australian Paralympic amputee athlete. At the 1984 New York/Stoke Mandeville Games, he won three gold medals in the Men's Long Jump A6, Men's Triple Jump A6, and Men's 4×100 m relay A4–9 events and a silver medal in the Men's High Jump A6 event. He also participated in the Australian men's standing volleyball team at the 2000 Sydney Games.

References

Paralympic athletes of Australia
Paralympic volleyball players of Australia
Athletes (track and field) at the 1984 Summer Paralympics
Volleyball players at the 2000 Summer Paralympics
Medalists at the 1984 Summer Paralympics
Paralympic gold medalists for Australia
Paralympic silver medalists for Australia
Paralympic medalists in athletics (track and field)
Australian amputees
Year of birth missing (living people)
Living people
Australian male sprinters
Australian male high jumpers
Australian male long jumpers
Australian male triple jumpers
Triple jumpers with limb difference
Sprinters with limb difference
Long jumpers with limb difference
High jumpers with limb difference
Paralympic sprinters
Paralympic long jumpers
Paralympic high jumpers
Paralympic triple jumpers